Qez Qaleh (also Romanized as Qez Qal‘eh; also known as Ghez Ghal’eh and Qiz Qal’eh) is a village in Dizaj Rural District, in the Central District of Khoy County, West Azerbaijan Province, Iran. At the 2006 census, its population was 839, in 194 families.

References 

Populated places in Khoy County